Antonio Vivaldi wrote a set of concerti, Op. 11, in 1729.

Concerto No. 1 for violin, strings and continuo in D Major, RV 207
Allegro
Largo
Allegro
Concerto No. 2 for violin, strings and figured bass in E minor, "Il favorito", RV 277
Allegro
Andante
Allegro
Concerto No. 3 for violin, strings and figured bass in A Major, RV 336
Allegro
Largo e cantabile
Allegro
Concerto No. 4 for violin, strings and figured bass in G Major, RV 308
Allegro
Largo
Allegro
Concerto No. 5 for violin, strings and figured bass in C minor, RV 202
Allegro
Andante
Allegro
Concerto No. 6 for oboe, strings and figured bass in G minor, RV 460
Allegro
Largo e cantabile
Allegro

Concertos by Antonio Vivaldi